Sæbø is a village in the municipality of Alver in Vestland county, Norway. The village is the site of Sæbø Church which serves the southern part of Radøy municipality.

Sæbø was the administrative centre of the old municipality of Sæbø which existed from 1924 until 1964.

References

Villages in Vestland
Alver (municipality)